Kirchevo is a village in Ugarchin Municipality, Lovech Province, northern Bulgaria. The city has a very small population and the closest major cities include Sofia, Plovdiv, Craiova and Bucharest.

References

Villages in Lovech Province